Keld Karise (born 20 March 1917) was a Danish rower. He competed in two events at the 1936 Summer Olympics.

References

External links

1917 births
Possibly living people
Danish male rowers
Olympic rowers of Denmark
Rowers at the 1936 Summer Olympics
Rowers from Copenhagen